A Sporting Double is a 1922 British silent drama film directed by Arthur Rooke and starring John Stuart, Lilian Douglas and Douglas Munro. The film is set in the horse racing world. It was re-released in 1926 by Butcher's Film Service.

Cast
 John Stuart as Will Blunt  
 Lilian Douglas as Ethel Grimshaw  
 Douglas Munro as John Brent  
 Humberston Wright as Henry Maxwell 
 Terence Cavanagh as Philip Harvey  
 Tom Coventry as Bargee  
 Frank Gray as Henry Grimshaw  
 Myrtle Vibart as Aurora

References

Bibliography
 Low, Rachael. History of the British Film, 1918-1929. George Allen & Unwin, 1971.

External links
 

1922 films
1922 drama films
British drama films
British silent feature films
Films directed by Arthur Rooke
British horse racing films
British black-and-white films
1920s English-language films
1920s British films
Silent drama films